The Democratic Alliance (DA) is a South African political party and the official opposition to the ruling African National Congress (ANC). The party is broadly centrist, and has been attributed both centre-left and centre-right policies. It is a member of Liberal International and the Africa Liberal Network. The DA traces its roots to the founding of the anti-apartheid Progressive Party in 1959, with many mergers and name changes between that time and the present. The DA ideologically shows a variety of liberal tendencies, including social liberalism, classical liberalism, and conservative liberalism.

The current leader of the party is John Steenhuisen, who was announced as the new leader on 1 November 2020 after the party's Federal Congress. He had previously acted as the interim leader of the party from November 2019 to November 2020. Helen Zille is chairperson of both the Federal Council and the Federal Executive, the highest decision-making structures of the party. In addition to governing several major metropolitan municipalities, the DA has been governing the Western Cape, one of South Africa's nine provinces, since the 2009 general election, having won a bigger majority at the election in 2014, but slightly losing support in the 2019 election. As of 2014, the party draws its support predominantly from Afrikaans- and English-speaking people (>80% of its voters), people aged over 35 (>65%), and white people (>50%), as well as the Indian and Coloured communities.

History

Beginnings in the Democratic Party
Although the Democratic Alliance in its present form is fairly new, its roots can be traced far back in South African political history, through a complex sequence of splits and mergers. The modern day DA is in large part a product of the white parliamentary opposition to the ruling National Party. The origin of the party can be traced to the mid 1950s when some younger members of the United Party felt that they were not providing strong enough opposition to the National Party and its policy of Apartheid, causing them to break away and form the Progressive Party in 1959. In the 1970s, as it rose to become the official opposition, the party would merge with more splinters from the disintegrating United Party and become known first as the Progressive Reform Party and then as the Progressive Federal Party. The Progressives sought to change the system from within, but in doing so chose to comply with Apartheid legislation outlawing multi-racial membership. During this time, the party was led by liberal-minded opponents of apartheid, such as Jan Steytler, Helen Suzman, Zach de Beer, Colin Eglin, Frederik van Zyl Slabbert and Harry Schwarz. In 1989, it would merge with two smaller reformist organisations to become the Democratic Party, a name that was retained into the 1990s when freedom was achieved. It was marginalised by the National Party's shift towards the center after 1990, and fared relatively poorly in the first democratic election in 1994, won by the African National Congress.

The DP would establish itself as a more effective party of opposition, however, and eventually rose from relative obscurity and ascended to the status of official opposition in 1999 under the leadership of Tony Leon, mainly by taking votes from the New National Party, the renamed version of the NP. The party also became kingmakers in the Western Cape province, where it formed a coalition government with the NNP. With a fractured national opposition standing against an increasingly dominant governing party, there was a perceived need to better challenge the ANC. To this end, the DP reached a merger agreement with the NNP and the much smaller Federal Alliance (FA) in 2000. Together, they formed the Democratic Alliance. The merger was ultimately aborted, with both the NNP and FA leaving the DA. Many former NNP members remained, and the new name was kept.

The DP was disbanded after the 2003 floor crossing period, establishing the DA at all levels of government.

Since becoming the Democratic Alliance in 2003  

The party consolidated its status as the official opposition in the 2004 general election, while the NNP collapsed. Having gone into opposition in the Western Cape in 2001 when the NNP formed a new coalition with the ANC, the demise of the NNP made the province a natural target for the party. In the 2006 municipal elections, the DA narrowly gained control of its largest city, Cape Town, in a multi-party coalition. Helen Zille, the executive mayor of Cape Town, then succeeded Leon as DA Party Leader in May 2007. In 2008, she re-launched the party as one that no longer acts solely as an opposition but also as an alternative choice for government. The party also introduced a new logo and a new slogan. Zille said the new DA would be "more reflective of our rich racial, linguistic and cultural heritage", and emphasized that she wanted it to be a "party for all the people" and not decline into a "shrinking, irrelevant minority". The Western Cape was won by DA with an outright majority in the 2009 general election, and Zille became the new provincial premier. In her newsletter, she wrote that "winning power in the Western Cape will allow us to show what co-operative governance between local authorities and a province can achieve". In the 2011 local government elections, the party won control of most of the municipalities in the Western Cape.

In 2013, the DA launched the "Know Your DA" campaign, in an attempt to try to show that the DA (via its proxy predecessor organisations) was involved in the struggle against apartheid. This campaign focused mainly on the role played by a few key individuals in opposing apartheid — particularly Helen Suzman and Helen Zille. The campaign received a certain amount of media attention, much of it somewhat sceptical. The ANC issued a detailed critique of the campaign, focusing especially on Suzman's role in the apartheid parliament. Partially on the basis of this campaign the DA contested the 2014 general election, where it once again grew its support base but failed in its stated goal of winning Gauteng province.

In the municipal elections of 2016, the DA made significant gains along with other opposition parties in some of the country's most important metropolitan areas. The DA currently governs Tshwane (including Pretoria, the administrative capital), Cape Town (South Africa's second-largest city and legislative capital) and various other municipalities.

In the general elections of 2019, the DA's national support declined for the first time in its history. The party retained control of the Western Cape but with a reduced majority and failed to win Gauteng once again. The conservative Freedom Front Plus made significant gains on the DA in the Afrikaner community. Since the election, the FF Plus has continued to make inroads in former DA strongholds.

Formation and mergers 

 1959 – Progressive Party breaks away from United Party.
 1975 – Progressive Party merges with Harry Schwarz's Reform Party, to form Progressive Reform Party.
 1977 – Progressive Reform Party merges with the Committee for a United Opposition to form the Progressive Federal Party.
 1989 – PFP merges with Denis Worrall's Independent Party and National Democratic Movement, to form Democratic Party.
 2000 – Democratic Party merges with New National Party and the Federal Alliance, to form Democratic Alliance (NNP and FA later withdrew).
 2010 – Democratic Alliance begins absorbing Patricia de Lille's Independent Democrats.
 2011 – Democratic Alliance absorbs Ziba Jiyane's South African Democratic Convention.

Ideology and principles 
The DA sums up its political philosophy as the belief in an "Open Opportunity Society for All". Former party leader Helen Zille has argued that this stands in direct contrast to the ruling ANC's approach to governance, which she maintains has led to a "closed, crony society for some". This formed the basis of the philosophy underlying the party's 2009 Election Manifesto, which seeks to build a society by linking outcomes to "opportunity, effort and ability".

The DA's historical roots are broadly liberal-democratic. During the 1990s, the party remained associated with liberal values, though party leader Tony Leon's support for the reintroduction of the death penalty, the party's controversial 1999 campaign slogan "Fight Back", and the short-lived alliance with the centre-right New National Party fuelled criticisms of the party from the left. After Helen Zille's election as party leader, the DA has attempted to reposition itself as a mainstream alternative to the ANC. The party's economic policy is also broadly centrist, and supports a mix of high spending on crucial social services such as education and health care, a basic income grant, and a strong regulatory framework, with more "moderate" policies such as a lower budget deficit and a deregulated labour market. At her 2009 State of the Province speech, party leader Zille described her party's economic policy as pragmatic: "We believe the state has a crucial role to play in socio-economic development. We are not free market fundamentalists. By the same token we do not believe that a state, with limited capacity, should over-reach itself."

Current policies

Crime 

In the DA's crime plan, "Conquering Fear, Commanding Hope", the DA committed itself to increasing the number of police officers to 250,000. This is 60,000 more than the government's own target. The party also announced plans to employ 30,000 additional detectives and forensics experts and 500 more prosecutors, in order to reduce court backlogs, and establish a Directorate for Victims of Crime, which would provide funding and support for crime victims.

In addition, the party announced its support for a prison labour programme, which would put prisoners to work in various community upliftment programmes. The proposal was criticised by labour unions, who believed it was unethical and would result in labour job losses.

In late 2008–2009, the DA took a stand against the South African Police Service's VIP Protection Unit, after several officers in the unit were charged with serious criminal offences. The party later released documentation of the unit's poor disciplinary record, and claimed its divisional commander had himself dodged serious criminal charges.

The DA strongly opposed the disbandment of the Scorpions crime investigation unit, and similar efforts to centralise the police service such as the nationwide disbandment of specialised Family Violence, Child Protection and Sexual Offences (FCS) units.

The party adopted a resolution declaring farm attacks and murders as hate crimes at its 2020 Federal Congress.

Social development

Central to the DA's social development policy, "Breaking the Cycle of Poverty", is a Basic Income Grant, which would provide a monthly transfer of R110 to all adults earning less than R46,000 per year. The party also supports legislation that would require the legal guardians of children living in poverty to ensure that their child attends 85 per cent of school classes, and undergoes routine health check-ups.

In addition, to aid with youth development skills, the party proposed a R6000 opportunity voucher or twelve month community service programme to all high school matriculants. The party also supports a universal old age pension, and the abolishment of pension means tests.

Education

The DA's education programme, "Preparing for Success", focuses on providing adequate physical and human resources to underperforming schools. The DA supports guaranteed access to a core minimum of resources for each school, proper state school nutrition schemes for grade 1–12 learners, and measures to train 30,000 additional teachers per year. The DA continues to support the introduction of new performance targets for teachers and schools, and also advocates a per-child wage subsidy, and a national network of community-based early childhood education centres.

Health

The DA's "Quality Care for All" programme is focused on tackling the country's high HIV/AIDS infection rate. Included in these plans is an increase in the number of clinics offering HIV testing and measures to provide all HIV-positive women with Nevirapine. The party's health policy also plans to devote more resources to vaccinations against common childhood illnesses.

The party also advocates creating a transparent and competitive health sector, to boost service delivery and encourage health care practitioners to remain in the country.

Economy

The DA's economic policy aims to create a society in which all South Africans enjoy both the fundamental freedoms guaranteed by the Constitution, and the opportunities to take advantage of those freedoms. In its 2010 Federal Congress booklet, The Open Opportunity Society for All, the party describes this society in the following terms: "Opportunity is the vehicle with which people are empowered to live their lives, pursue their dreams and develop their full potential. And the DA believes that the role of the government is to provide every citizen with a minimum basic standard of quality services and resources with which to be able to do so – a framework for choice."

The DA therefore advocates a mixed-economy approach, where the state is involved in the economy only to the extent that it can expand opportunity and choice.

The manifesto includes various proposals detailing how a DA government would manage the economy and facilitate growth. The majority of the interventions suggested by the party are aimed at creating an atmosphere conducive to job creation and greater foreign direct investment.

The DA has suggested measures to make South Africa's labour market more amenable to job creation. The party has also suggested several targeted interventions to allow for higher employment, especially amongst the youth. These interventions include a wage subsidy programme to reduce the cost of hiring first-time workers.

The DA has committed itself to a counter-cyclical fiscal policy approach. This is evident in the party's previous alternative budget frameworks, with both alternative budgets posting deficits. The party defended this stance by arguing that increased spending was necessary to help the economy out of recession. Other fiscal interventions have included a proposed scrapping of value added tax (VAT) on books and tax rebates for crime prevention expenditure by businesses.

The DA supports an inflation-targeting monetary policy regime similar to that of the ANC government. It has also repeatedly reaffirmed its support and commitment for reserve bank instrument independence. The DA proposes to incentivise savings by reducing taxes on income earned from fixed deposits that are held for longer than twelve months. The party states that this would help South Africa to boost its domestic savings rate to enable the country to invest in projects that will provide additional job opportunities.

The party has rejected the ANC's approach to Black Economic Empowerment, with former party leader Helen Zille arguing that the current policies have only served to enrich a small elite of politically connected businessmen. The party proposed an alternative it calls broad-based economic empowerment, which would provide for targeted interventions focusing on skills training and socio-economic investment instead of ownership targets. The party believes that this approach will give a broader group of black South Africans an opportunity to compete and partake in the economy.

The party advocates an active industrial policy that allows the Industrial Development Corporation (IDC) to co-ordinate industrial policy. Additionally it would also set up a sovereign venture capital fund to help support innovation in key industries. The DA also supports the creation of Industrial Development Zones and Export Processing Zones. The party suggests that by relaxing certain regulations in these zones, manufacturers and exporters would be able to grow faster and employ more people. This fits into the party's broader vision of growing the economy by cutting red tape and regulations it claims is holding back South Africa's economic growth.

The DA has been against the introduction of a national minimum wage, arguing that workers should be allowed to accept a wage of less than R3500 on their own terms. In contrast, President Cyril Ramaphosa stated that the R3500 per month (R20 an hour) minimum wage was still not a living wage, and would only "advance the struggle for a living wage".

Land

The DA is resolutely against land expropriation without compensation. This is in response to the ANC and the EFF's recent attempts to change section 25 of the Constitution which deals with land reform. The DA says that changing the Constitution will open the floodgates and undermine property rights, allowing government to own all land and forcing all South Africans to be only permanent tenants of the land. The party says that it is committed to ensuring that those entitled to land receive it in the form of direct ownership, and not as lifelong tenants.

The DA's "Land of Opportunity" programme supports the "willing buyer, willing seller" principle, though it also allows for expropriation for reform purposes in certain limited circumstances. The party has been critical of the resources that government has allocated to land reform, claiming that government has not been sufficiently active in buying up land that comes onto the market. Though the DA believes this could speed up the pace of land reform, their policies have been vocally criticised by members of the Tripartite Alliance. Land Affairs Minister Thoko Didiza accused the DA of attempting to "stifle" land reform, while the South African Communist Party contended that the DA's policies overly favoured big business. In a speech at the DA's national congress in April 2018, DA Leader, Mmusi Maimane, praised DA Western Cape Provincial Leader, Bonginkosi Madikizela, for overseeing the delivery of 91 000 title deeds in the province and allowing residents to have full title deeds to their homes.

Environment and energy

In the build up to the 2009 elections, the DA announced it would create a new Ministry of Energy and Climate Change, to ensure improved integrated energy planning in order to deal with South Africa's growing carbon dioxide emissions. The DA's 2009 environment and energy plan, "In Trust for the Nation" proposed new measures to increase energy efficiency, and the introduction of sectoral carbon emission targets.

Electoral reform

The DA broadly supports reforms recommended by Frederik van Zyl Slabbert's electoral reform task-team, that would see the current party list voting system replaced by a 75% constituency-based/25% proportional representation-based electoral system that would apply at the national and provincial level. The DA's governance policy Promoting Open Opportunity Governance also makes provision for the direct election of the president, which would give voters a more direct link to the executive branch.

The DA believe voting rights should be extended to include all South African citizens who are living and working abroad, many of whom intend returning. Since 2013, South Africans living abroad can now register and vote in national elections.

Electoral performance 

These charts show the electoral performance for the Democratic Alliance, and its predecessor the Democratic Party, since the advent of democracy in 1994:

National elections

National Assembly 

|-
! Election
! Total votes
! Share of vote
! Seats
! +/–
! Government
|-
! 1994
| 338,426
| 1.73%
| 
| –
| 
|-
! 1999
| 1,527,337
| 9.56%
| 
|  31
| 
|-
! 2004
| 1,931,201
| 12.37%
| 
|  12
| 
|-
! 2009
| 2,945,829
| 16.66%
| 
|  17
| 
|-
! 2014
| 4,091,584
| 22.20%
| 
|  22
| 
|-
! 2019
| 3,621,188
| 20.77%
| 
|  5
| 
|}

National Council of Provinces 

|-
! Election
! Total # ofseats won
! +/–
! Government
|-
! 1994
| 
| –
| 
|-
! 1999
| 
|  5
| 
|-
! 2004
| 
|  4
| 
|-
! 2009
| 
|  1
| 
|-
! 2014
| 
|  7
| 
|-
! 2019
| 
|  0
| 
|}

Provincial elections 

! rowspan=2 | Election
! colspan=2 | Eastern Cape
! colspan=2 | Free State
! colspan=2 | Gauteng
! colspan=2 | Kwazulu-Natal
! colspan=2 | Limpopo
! colspan=2 | Mpumalanga
! colspan=2 | North-West
! colspan=2 | Northern Cape
! colspan=2 | Western Cape
|-
! % !! Seats
! % !! Seats
! % !! Seats
! % !! Seats
! % !! Seats
! % !! Seats
! % !! Seats
! % !! Seats
! % !! Seats
|-
! 1994
| 2.05% || 1/56
| 0.57% || 0/30
| 5.32% || 5/86
| 2.15% || 2/81
| 0.21% || 0/40
| 0.56% || 0/30
| 0.50% || 0/30
| 1.87% || 1/30
| 6.64% || 3/42
|-
! 1999
| 6.29% || 4/63
| 5.33% || 2/30
| 17.95% || 13/73
| 8.16% || 7/80
| 1.42% || 1/49
| 4.48% || 1/30
| 3.26% || 1/30
| 4.77% || 1/30
| 11.91% || 5/42
|-
! 2004
| 7.34% || 5/63
| 8.47% || 3/30
| 20.78% || 15/73
| 8.35% || 7/80
| 3.59% || 2/49
| 6.94% || 2/30
| 5.00% || 2/33
| 11.08% || 3/30
| 27.11% || 12/42
|-
! 2009
| 9.99% || 6/63
| 11.60% || 3/30
| 21.86% || 16/73
| 9.15% || 7/80
| 3.48% || 2/49
| 7.49% || 2/30
| 8.25% || 3/33
| 12.57% || 4/30
| 51.46% || 22/42
|-
! 2014
| 16.20% || 10/63
| 16.23% || 5/30
| 30.78% || 23/73
| 12.76% || 10/80
| 6.48% || 3/49
| 10.40% || 3/30
| 12.73% || 4/33
| 23.89% || 7/30
| 59.38% || 26/42
|-
! 2019
| 15.73% || 10/63
| 17.58% || 6/30
| 27.45% || 20/73
| 13.90% || 11/80
| 5.40% || 3/49
| 9.77% || 3/30
| 11.18% || 4/33
| 25.51% || 8/30
| 55.45% || 24/42
|}

Municipal election results 

|-
! Election
! Ward + PR votes
! %
! +/–
|-
! 1995–96
| 302,006
| 3.48%
| –
|-
! 2000
| 3,816,909
| 22.1%
|  18.6
|-
! 2006
| 3,203,896
| 16.3%
|  5.8
|-
! 2011
| 6,393,886
| 23.9%
|  9.1
|-
! 2016
| 8,033,630
| 26.9%
|  3.0
|-
! 2021
| 5,082,664
| 21.66%
|  5.2
|}

Organisation and structure

Democratic Alliance Youth 
The Democratic Alliance Youth (DA Youth), which came officially into being in late 2008, was first led by Makashule Gana until 2013, Mbali Ntuli led between 2013 and 2014, Yusuf Cassim led from 2014 to 2018 and Luyolo Mphithi led from 2018 to 2022. The current Interim Federal Leader, Nicholas Nyati, was elected at the Interim Democratic Alliance Youth Federal Congress in 2022. Robin Atson, Kamogelo Makola, Chadwin Petersen and Lindokuhle Sixabayi are the Interim DA Youth Federal Deputy Chaipersons in Administration, Recruitment, Training and Development, and Media and Publicity, respectively.

In the Gauteng Province, the first dually elected Democratic Alliance Youth Provincial Executive Committee took office in November 2017 after they were elected at the Gauteng Provincial Congress the same year. It consists of Pogiso Mthimunye (Chairperson), Patrick Oberholster (Deputy Chairperson), Khathutshelo Rasilingwane (Recruitment and Campaigns) and Prudence Mollo (Training and Development).

In the North West Province of South Africa, Emi Koekemoer is the elected Provincial Chairperson while Henning Lubbe takes the role as Provincial Deputy Chairperson of Administration, Quinton Booysen fills the role of Provincial Deputy Chairperson of Recruitment and Campaigns, Percilla Mompe is the Provincial Deputy Chairperson of Media and Publicity and Neo Mabote is the Provincial Deputy Chairperson of Training and Development.

Democratic Alliance Women's Network 

Until 28 April 2021, the Democratic Alliance Women's Network (DAWN) federal leader was Nomafrench Mbombo, who is also the current Western Cape Minister of Health. The deputy federal leader is Safiyia Stanfley.

According to the DAWN constitution:

DAWN will:

 promote the empowerment and development of women and help build their self-confidence to stimulate and activate initiatives.
 promote amongst women a consciousness of accountability, patriotism and unity.
 promote women's participation in every sector of public life.
 promote a healthy culture of the recognition of women's rights as human rights.
 oppose violence against women wherever possible.

Each province has a provincial DAWN chairperson. The provincial chairpersons are as follows:

 Eastern Cape: Georgina Faldtman 
 Free State: Deliwe Mvala-Majola
 Gauteng: Stefanie Ueckermann 
 KwaZulu-Natal: Shehana Kajee
 Limpopo: Désirée van der Walt
 Mpumalanga:  Annerie Weber
 Northern Cape: Gizella Opperman
 North-West: Obakeng Molefe
 Western Cape: Wendy Philander

Democratic Alliance Abroad 

The DA Abroad is the Democratic Alliance's supporters network for South Africans who live outside the South African border. The DA Abroad aims to grow the DA's overseas voter base, actively lobby for international awareness and influence for the furtherance of policies and action programmes of the DA and develop a global interconnected community that supports an open opportunity society for all.

The Democratic Alliance Abroad (DA Abroad) was officially launched in November 2009. Previously the DA Abroad was led by Ludre Stevens between 2009–2015 and then by Francine Higham between 2015–2019 with Morné Van der Waltsleben as Global Operations Chair from 2013–2017. Between 2019 and 2021 it was led by Rory Jubber with Nigel Bruce acting as Chairperson. On 27 August 2021, Ludre Stevens was elected unopposed as DA Abroad Leader.

The DA Abroad has hubs in the UK, North America, Europe, Africa, Asia and Australasia.

Democratic Alliance Young Leaders Programme 
The DA's Young Leaders Programme (YLP) is a political leadership development programme for South Africans between the ages of 18 and 35.

See also 

 Liberalism
 Contributions to liberal theory
 Liberalism worldwide
 List of liberal parties
 Liberal democracy
 Liberalism in South Africa
 Anti-racism

Notes

References 
 Terreblanche, Christelle. "Zille says DA can win." IOL. 31 January 2009. (accessed 2 February 2009).

External links 

List of articles & videos about the DA

 
Liberal International
Centrist parties in South Africa
Liberal parties in South Africa
Political parties in South Africa
Political parties supporting universal basic income